The Diocese of the Central States is a Reformed Episcopal Church and an Anglican Church in North America diocese. The diocese has 20 congregations in the American states of Alabama, Northwest Florida, Indiana, Kentucky, Ohio, North Carolina, Tennessee, Virginia and West Virginia. Daniel Morse became missionary bishop at the creation of the diocese in 2008, and he served as bishop ordinary until 2019. On January 1, 2020, Peter Manto became bishop ordinary of the diocese, with Daniel Morse retiring to become bishop emeritus.

History
The diocese was launched on 1 January 2008 as the Missionary Diocese of the Central States, joining the Anglican Church in North America upon its creation in June 2009. When the diocese reached full diocesan status in the REC and the ACNA in 2011, the name was changed to Diocese of the Central States, after experiencing considerable growth in the previous three years. The first Synod took place 25 and 26 October 2011, at the Resurrection Anglican Church, in Shalimar, Florida.

Covenant Reformed Episcopal Church
A member of the Diocese of the Central States is "Covenant Reformed Episcopal Church", a historic Reformed Episcopal church and rectory located at Roanoke, Virginia.  
The Covenant Church is across the street from the historic Starkey School, and "Covenant Reformed Episcopal Church is located in the Cave Spring area of southwest Roanoke County." Covenant Church is part of a founding jurisdiction of the Anglican Church in North America
The current church building was built between 1920-1921, and is a plain wooden church on a stone foundation in the austere Protestant style. There are few permanent decorations in the church, and no stained glass windows. The brass Candelabra and other fixtures are in the Colonial Williamsburg style. Also located on the property is a rectory built in 1945.  An earlier Reformed Episcopal Church, Providence Reformed Episcopal Church, transferred all care of property and title to the daughter Covenant Church on March 1, 1984.

Recent Covenant Church Vicars
 The Rev. Jeff Welch (1981 - 1988)
 The Rev. Rodney Longmire, Jr. (1988 - 2009)
 The Rev. Richard Workowski, (2012 - 2015)
 The Rev. William H. Smith (2015 – 2017)
 The Rev. Bart Martin (2018)
 The Rev. Richard Workowski (interim vicar, 2018 – 2021)
 The Rev. Mel Williams (priest-in-charge) (2021 - present)

The vestry of Covenant Church both supported and encouraged the writings of Allen C. Guelzo in his book, "For the Union of Evangelical Christendom: The Irony of the Reformed Episcopalians".

References

External links
The Diocese of the Central States Official Website

Dioceses of the Anglican Church in North America
Anglican dioceses established in the 21st century
Dioceses of the Reformed Episcopal Church